The Glenn Miller Orchestra is a band formed after the loss of Glenn Miller, named in memory of him and the original Glenn Miller Orchestra.

History
After the disappearance of Glenn Miller in 1944, the band was reconstituted under the direction of Tex Beneke, its lead tenor saxophonist, singer, and one of Miller's longtime close friends. A few years later, the Miller estate, having parted ways with Beneke over creative differences, hired Ray McKinley, principal drummer and later leader of the Major Glenn Miller Army Air Forces Orchestra, to organize a new "ghost band" in 1956, the Glenn Miller Orchestra.  In the 1990s, the GMO was also called the World-Famous Glenn Miller Orchestra.

Hollywood contributed to the band's popularity and that of its founder and original members with the 1953 release of The Glenn Miller Story on the big screen.  The band garnered award nominations and box office success, as well as top hit status for its soundtrack album in 1954.

The Glenn Miller Orchestra has recorded and performed under various leaders, from 1956 to this day. Clarinetist Buddy DeFranco succeeded McKinley in 1966.

Larry O'Brien served as director of the World-Famous Glenn Miller Orchestra from 1981 to 1983 and from 1988 to 2010.

Singer Nick Hilscher became the director of the touring band in 2012, replacing previous director Gary Tole.

Saxophonist/Vocalist Erik Stabnau was announced as Music Director in August 2021.

Members
Current as of 2022
 Erik Stabnau – Music Director / Vocalist / Tenor Saxophone
 Jenny Swoish – Female Vocalist
 Kevin Sheehan – Lead Alto Saxophone, Clarinet, Flute, Arranger
 Gary Meggs – 2nd Alto Saxophone, Clarinet
 Allen Cordingley – Tenor Saxophone 1, Clarinet, Flute
 Justin Williams – Tenor Saxophone 2, Clarinet, flute
 Connor Baba – Baritone Saxophone, Alto Saxophone, Bass Clarinet, Flute
 Ashley Hall – Lead Trumpet
 Matthew Gates – Split Lead /2nd Trumpet
 Joe Young IV – Jazz/3rd Trumpet 
 Christopher Stein – Trumpet /4th Trumpet
 George Reinert III – Lead Trombone
 Dave Ashley – 2nd Trombone
 Dan Gabel – 3rd Trombone
 Michael DeSousa – Bass Trombone, 4th Trombone
 Gil Scott Chapman – Piano/Sound Tech
 Dean Schweiger – Drums
 Charlie Himel – Upright Bass

Discography

Albums
1983: "In the Digital Mood"

References

American classical music groups
American jazz ensembles
Big bands
Musical groups established in 1956
Swing music
1956 establishments in the United States